Saint Muiredach mac Echdach, also known as Murtagh, was the founding Bishop of Killala, Ireland in the 6th century.

Muiredach is described as an old man of Patrick's family, and was placed at the head of the Church of Killala by St. Patrick, patron saint of Ireland as early as 442 or 443.

He was connected to the royal family of King Lóegaire mac Néill. He allegedly met with St. Columba in the year 575, in a town called Ballysadare. He probably resigned after a few years, and retired to an island off the Sligo coast in Donegal Bay.

The uninhabited island, Inishmurray, bears his name. He may also be the patron of the monastery that was on that island. He died there as a hermit, and his feast day is 12 August.

References

Bishops of Killala
6th-century Christian saints
Canonizations by Pope Leo XIII
5th-century Irish priests
6th-century Irish bishops
Medieval saints of Connacht
Disciples of Saint Patrick